16α-Hydroxyestrone (16α-OH-E1), or hydroxyestrone, also known as estra-1,3,5(10)-triene-3,16α-diol-17-one, is an endogenous steroidal estrogen and a major metabolite of estrone, as well as an intermediate in the biosynthesis of estriol. It is a potent estrogen similarly to estrone, and it has been suggested that the ratio of 16α-hydroxyestrone to 2-hydroxyestrone, the latter being much less estrogenic in comparison and even antiestrogenic in the presence of more potent estrogens like estradiol, may be involved in the pathophysiology of breast cancer. Conversely, 16α-hydroxyestrone may help to protect against osteoporosis.

In terms of relative binding affinity (RBA) for the rat uterine estrogen receptor, 16α-hydroxyestrone showed 2.8% of the affinity of estradiol. For comparison, estrone had 11% of the affinity and estriol had 10% of the affinity of estradiol. In contrast to other estrogens, the binding  of 16α-hydroxyestrone to the estrogen receptor is reported to be covalent and irreversible. 16α-Hydroxyestrone has been reported to have 25% of the vaginal estrogenic potency of estradiol. The maximal uterotrophic and antigonadotropic effect of 16α-hydroxyestrone was equivalent to those of estradiol and estriol, indicating that 16α-hydroxyestrone is a fully effective estrogen. However, 16α-hydroxyestrone was much less potent than estradiol or estrone.

The C3 and C16α diacetate ester of 16α-hydroxyestrone, hydroxyestrone diacetate (brand names Colpoginon, Colpormon, Hormobion, and Hormocervix), has been marketed and used medically as an estrogen in Europe.

See also
 2-Hydroxyestrone
 2-Hydroxyestradiol
 16β-Hydroxyestrone
 16-Ketoestrone
 16α-Hydroxydehydroepiandrosterone
 16α-Hydroxyandrostenedione
 15α-Hydroxydehydroepiandrosterone

References

Acyloins
Estranes
Estrogens
Human metabolites
Phenols